Sophie Cates (born August 25, 1999), formerly known as Silver Sphere, is an American singer-songwriter. She independently released her debut extended play Yikes! in October 2019, and was subsequently signed to RCA Records. In September 2020, she released her second EP, All My Boyfriends, through RCA.

Career
In 2018, Cates independently released her debut single, "Drinking Games", using the stage name Silver Sphere. She wrote and produced the song herself at the age of 18 while studying at Columbia College. This was followed by other singles including "Boys In Bands" and "Sucks 4 U". On October 2, 2019, she independently released her debut extended play, Yikes!. Abby Wright of The Central Trend described the album as "a vibrant treasure map of pockets" and stated that she "really, really liked" the project.

The release of Yikes! led to Cates being signed by RCA Records, and on July 22, 2020, she released her debut major-label single, "Crowd". On the day of its release, she announced that her second extended play, All My Boyfriends, would be released on September 23, 2020. Prior to the EP's release, she released "Handle Me" as a single on August 12, 2020. After the EP's release, Sienna Estrada of Earmilk praised Cates for demonstrating artistic growth, noting the contrast in sound between Yikes! and All My Boyfriends, noting her "bright pop melodies and attitude". On November 25, 2020, she released the single "Football Game". In July 2021, Cates announced via social media that she would be using her birth name as her professional artist name. In 2022 she self-released "Nasty" and "Cardigan" off her upcoming extended play Basement Party.

Personal life 
Since 2020, she has been dating fellow singer-songwriter Lauv.

Discography

Extended plays

Singles

As lead artist

As featured artist

Music videos

Songwriting credits

Tours

Supporting 

 Jeremy Zucker: MORE NOISE!!!! Tour (2022)

References

External links
 

1999 births
21st-century American women singers
21st-century American singers
American electronic musicians
American women pop singers
American women songwriters
American pop rock singers
American synth-pop musicians
American women in electronic music
Feminist musicians
Living people
RCA Records artists
Singers from Chicago